Anacropora is a genus of stony corals in the Acroporidae family. They are sometimes called briar corals and there are seven known species.

Description
Members of this genus are generally fragile corals with branches less than ten centimetres long which form small colonies. The branches are either spreading or may be clustered and are sometimes fused together. The calices are rounded and up to one millimetre in diameter. The area between the calices is porous with numerous small tubercles. There are no axial corallites and the main septa number six with a few more subsidiary ones. The small radial corallites have an ‘empty’ appearance  similar to Montipora. The delicate tentacles can often be seen extended during the day.

Distribution
Members of this genus occur in the Indian Ocean and the western Pacific being found mostly in muddy waters. They are generally uncommon and are not a reef species.

Species
Anacropora forbesi - Ridley, 1884
Anacropora matthai - Pillai, 1973
Anacropora pillai - Veron, 2002
Anacropora puertogalerae - Nemenzo, 1964
Anacropora reticulata - Veron and Wallace, 1984
Anacropora spinosa - Rehberg, 1892
Anacropora spumosa - Veron, Turak & DeVantier, 2002

References

Acroporidae
Cnidarians of the Pacific Ocean
Fauna of the Indian Ocean
Marine fauna of Asia
Marine fauna of Oceania
Scleractinia genera